John Westlake may refer to:
 John Westlake (law scholar), English law scholar
 John A. Westlake, British–Czech hi-fi designer